Richard Terry may refer to:
Ben Terry (Richard Benjamin Terry, fl. 1877–1881), Test cricket umpire
Sir Richard Terry (musicologist) (1864–1938), English organist, choir director and musicologist
Richard Terry, chef de cuisine of the Oriental Club, author of Indian Cookery (1861)
Rick Terry (born 1974), American football player